The Abelló Museum is a municipal art museum located in Mollet del Vallès, in El Vallès Oriental. Opened on 29 March 1999, its principal collection comprises pieces from artist and collector Joan Abelló, which donated his collection to the city in 1996, creating the Joan Abelló Foundation, an independent organisation of the Mollet del Vallès Town Council. 
The museum is located in an Art Nouveau-style building from 1908, of which only the façade has been preserved.

The collection
The collection, entitled Modern art from the Abelló collection, 19th-20th centuries, has more than 5,000 works of art, especially Catalan paintings from the 19th and 20th centuries. The collection boasts works from such artists as Ramon Casas, Modest Cuixart, Salvador Dalí, Joan Miró, Pablo Picasso and Antoni Tàpies, in addition to Abelló’s own works.
The museum also shows a collection of Romanesque and Baroque sculpture, as well as Asian and African art.
Noteworthy pieces
Isidre Nonell - Porta de l'estudi and Cap d'home
Ramon Casas - Esbós per a l'anunci d'Anís del Mono
Darío de Regoyos - Víctimas de la fiesta (1894)
Josep Llimona - Melangia
Joan Ponç i Bonet - Dau al Set (1949)
Manolo Hugué - Torero (1937)
Pancho Cossio - Bodegó

References

External links
 
 Local Museum Network site

Barcelona Provincial Council Local Museum Network
Vallès Oriental
Art museums and galleries in Catalonia
1999 establishments in Catalonia
Art museums established in 1999
Modernisme architecture in Catalonia